Española Valley may refer to:

Española Valley High School, Española, New Mexico, United States
Española, New Mexico, a city in Rio Arriba County, New Mexico, United States